Montcalm is a rural municipality (RM) in the province of Manitoba in Western Canada. The Canada 2016 Census reported a population of 1,260 persons, a decrease from the 1,309 reported in the 2011 Census.

Geography
The RM has an area of 469.41 km2 (181.24 sq mi).

The Canada–United States border opposite Pembina County, North Dakota forms a small part of Montcalm's southern boundary; there is no direct road link between the RM and county.  The Roseau River Anishinabe First Nation is situated between Montcalm and the neighbouring Municipality of Emerson – Franklin.  Montcalm also borders the municipalities of Rhineland, De Salaberry, and Morris, as well as the eastern edge of the Town of Morris.  The Red River of the North flows northward though the eastern part of Montcalm.

Most of the St. Joseph Wind Farm lies within the RM.

Communities
 Letellier
 St. Jean Baptiste
 St. Joseph
 Ste. Elizabeth

Demographics 

See also
Manitoba Highway 75

References

External links
 Official website
 Map of Montcalm R.M. at Statcan

Montcalm